George Sims may refer to:
 George Frederick Sims (1923–1999), English bookseller and crime writer 
 George Robert Sims (1847–1922), English journalist, writer and bon vivant
 George R. Sims (New Port Richey) (1876–1954), founder of New Port Richey
 George Sims (educator), British educator
 A. E. Sims (1896–1981), British composer, conductor and Royal Air Force officer, sometimes known as George
 George Carol Sims (1902–1966), American pulp fiction author and screenwriter who wrote as Paul Cain
 George Sims (American football) (born 1927), American football player

See also
 George Gall Sim (1878–1930), British administrator in India